Glenroy Football Club is an Australian rules football club located 14 km north of Melbourne in the suburb of Glenroy. The club was founded in 1946 and affiliated with the Essendon District Football League. The club fields open age and junior teams.
Glenroy are known as the Wallabies and wear a red jumper with a white sash.  The club enjoys strong community support from a range of small businesses and institutions.  Their last B-Grade premiership in 2008 resulted in their promotion to A-Grade under former premiership player Ash Manning.  Due to a mass exodus of player personnel, Glenroy's young list struggled to match it with the hardened quality opposition in 2009.  In 2010, former Northcote Park veteran Brett Jeffrey took the reins of player coach. The club had an up and down year, finally settling for 6th position and failing to make the finals.  In 2012 Former Carlton Legend & Captain Lance Whitnall took over as playing coach. In his second year he took Glenroy to the 2013 B grade Grand Final only to just fall short of winning the game.

Senior Premierships  (14) 
 A Grade
 1966, 1982, 1983, 1986
 B Grade
 1949, 1951, 1974, 1980, 1997, 2008, 2017
 A3 Grade
 1983, 1985
 C Grade
 1963.

VFL/AFL players 
 Aaron Kite
 John O'Connell
 Lance Whitnall

Sources 
 Australian Football
 EDFL Website
 Footypedia

Essendon District Football League clubs
1946 establishments in Australia
Australian rules football clubs established in 1946
Australian rules football clubs in Melbourne
Sport in the City of Merri-bek